Eva Antonia Gallardo-Gutiérrez (born 1973) is a Spanish mathematician specializing in operator theory. She is a professor of mathematics at the Complutense University of Madrid, deputy director of the Institute of Mathematical Sciences (Spain), and the president of the Royal Spanish Mathematical Society.

Gallardo completed her Ph.D. at the University of Seville in 2000. Her dissertation, Ciclicidad de operadores: Teoría espectral, was supervised by Alfonso Montes-Rodríguez. With Montes-Rodríguez, she is a coauthor of a research monograph, The Role of the Spectrum in the Cyclic Behavior of Composition Operators (American Mathematical Society, 2004).

References

External links

1973 births
Living people
20th-century Spanish mathematicians
Spanish women mathematicians
University of Seville alumni
Academic staff of the Complutense University of Madrid
21st-century Spanish mathematicians